Roscommon–Galway is a parliamentary constituency in Dáil Éireann, the lower house of the Irish parliament or Oireachtas. It first returned 3 members (Teachtaí Dála, commonly known as TDs) in the 2016 general election. The method of election is proportional representation by means of the single transferable vote (PR-STV).

History and boundaries
The constituency was established by the Electoral (Amendment) (Dáil Constituencies) Act 2013 and first used at the 2016 election. The Electoral (Amendment) (Dáil Constituencies) Act 2017 defines the constituency as:

TDs

Elections

2020 general election

2016 general election

See also
Dáil constituencies
Elections in the Republic of Ireland
Politics of the Republic of Ireland
List of Dáil by-elections
List of political parties in the Republic of Ireland

References

Dáil constituencies
Politics of County Roscommon
Politics of County Galway
2016 establishments in Ireland
Constituencies established in 2016